Llewellyn John Martin (25 April 1920 – 13 November 2001) was an Australian rules footballer who played with Fitzroy in the Victorian Football League (VFL). 

Martin's senior career consisted of two games late in the 1939 VFL season, in both games being the 19th man who replaced an injured team mate in the last quarter.

Two years later Martin joined the 2nd AIF to serve in World War II after several years serving in the Army Reserve. In September 1941 he was posted to Singapore and was commissioned as an officer a month later. He was captured in the fall of Singapore in February 1942 and was interred in the Changi Camp. He was recovered from the Japanese in September 1945 and returned to Australia later that year.

Notes

External links 

1920 births		
2001 deaths		
Australian rules footballers from Melbourne
Fitzroy Football Club players
Australian Army personnel of World War II
Australian prisoners of war
World War II prisoners of war held by Japan
Australian Army officers
People from Northcote, Victoria
Military personnel from Melbourne